Elaine "Jae" Jarrell (born Elaine Annette Johnson in 1935) is an American artist best known for her fashion designs and her involvement with the Black Arts Movement of the 1960s. Influenced by her grandfather, Jay Jarrell, and his work as a tailor, Jarrell learned about fabrics and sewing at a young age. It was learning these skills that set her on her path as an artist, fashion designer, and vintage clothing dealer.

In 1968, Jae Jarrell, along with Wadsworth Jarrell, Jeff Donaldson, Barbara Jones-Hogu, and Gerald Williams, founded AfriaCOBRA, the African Commune of Bad Relevant Artists. As part of their manifesto, Jarrell strived to provide positive representation of the African diaspora. Her goal was to produce garments that inspired pride, power, energy, and respect in African American communities.

Early life and education 
Jarrell grew up in the historical neighborhood of Glenville in Cleveland, Ohio. During her childhood, she was inspired by the legacy of her grandfather. His work as a tailor led to her develop knowledge of clothing fabrics, fibers, and weaves. She was also influenced by the success of her uncle’s haberdashery shop, where he sold fabric and sewing tools. His achievements in business made her want to open her own store.  

In addition to the influence of her grandfather and uncle, her mother took her to vintage shops and taught her to respect the craftsmanship that goes into making clothing. This set Jarrell further on her path as an artist. When speaking about this experience with Rose Bouthillier (2015), Jarrell said:
"And so I always thought of making clothes in order to have something unique, and later I learned to sew very well and made it my business to always make my garments. And I also have a love for vintage, knowing that it has secrets of the past that I can unfold," (p. 64).

Jarrell attended Bowling Green State University before moving to Chicago to attend the School of the Art Institute of Chicago During the late 1950s and early 60s, she attended the same art school as Wadsworth Jarrell, a fellow artist who would later become her husband   However, the couple didn't meet until 1963 after Jarrell opened her own vintage boutique

Career

Chicago 
During her early years in Chicago, Jarrell worked at a temporary job at Motorola. During her time there, a female co-worker helped her create the name, "Jae", which she then continued to use when producing her art. According to Jarrell, after she shared her secret desire to be a designer and own a shop, the woman suggested that she use the reverse order of her maiden name, Elaine Annette Johnson, as an acronym. Following her advice, Jarrell opened a store near the famous Hyde Park and called it "Jae of Hyde Park."

Chicago would also be important for both Jae and Wadsworth, as it would be the city in which they would help create AfriCOBRA. In an interview, Jarrell credited Chicago for being a forward-thinking city and appreciated it for its open-mindedness; without these traits, she says that she wasn't sure if AfriCOBRA would have succeeded.

In 1967, she married Wadsworth Jarrell, and they honeymooned in Nassau, Bahamas. She had their first child, Wadsworth Jr., on January 7, 1968. After giving birth to their second child, Jennifer, the Jarrell's decided to relocate to New York to escape the social and economic downturn in Chicago.

Following her involvement with AfriCOBRA in Chicago, Jarrell would eventually move to Washington D.C. to once again pursue learning by completing her BFA and graduate work at Howard University.

AfriCobra 
Much of Jarrell's art was created as a member of AfriCOBRA, the African American artist collective that sought to invoke the styles of African art while infusing a strong call for revolution. AfriCOBRA formed out of the remains of the Coalition of Black Revolutionary Artists (COBRA) and centralized around the idea of Black pride and Black empowerment that comes from feeling powerful and standing tall  AfriCOBRA even had a manifesto written by one of its founding members, Jeff Donaldson, in which he wrote out some of the main staples of AfriCOBRA's art making as well as what the collective stood for. In one section, Donaldson spoke of the kind of art that the members would make, saying that it would fit into one of three categories:
   Definition — images that deal with the past.
   Identification — images that relate to the present.
   Direction — images that look into the future.

Going further in the manifesto, Donaldson gave very thorough detail about the artistic direction of the collective, providing a list of qualities that he cut down to the six most important ones which are as follows:
 Expressive Awesomeness — the feeling "that one experiences in African art and life in the U.S.A.";
 Symmetry and Rhythm — "repetition with change, based on African music and African movement";
 Mimesis — "the plus and the minus, the abstract and the concrete";
 Organic looking — "We want the work to look like the creator made it through us";
 Shine — "We want the things to shine, to have the rich luster of a just-washed 'fro, of spit-shined shoes, of de-ashened elbows and knees and noses";
 Color — "color that shines, color that is free of rules and regulations…. Color that is expressively awesome".
This manifesto would dictate the way that AfriCOBRA was conducted and, as a result,  was influential in the way that Jae Jarrell would shape her art while a part of the collective.
With AfriCOBRA, Jarrell, along with the rest of the collective, aimed to use her art to build a positive learning community that promoted Black pride among the community as well as to whoever was lucky enough to experience any art from the collective. During an interview with the Never the Same Foundation, Jarrell said:
"We made an effort to raise a consciousness. In our hearts, when we put this all together, we thought it was going to be an explosion of positive imagery, and things that gave kids direction, and knowing some of our leaders now portrayed in a fresh way. I saw a result of our raising the consciousness, particularly about our history."

Despite being grouped into the same realm as the Black Panthers and other radical Black groups, AfriCOBRA, as Jarrell saw it, was always driven by positivity and empowerment of African Americans. In the same interview, Jarrell talked about how she used history as a reference only when looking at times of African empowerment and thereby avoided using things like segregation as a reference, not only for herself, but for the AfriCOBRA collective as well.

When creating art for AfriCOBRA, Jarrell made her unique garments, using the body as a vessel for revolution and identity   Her pieces reflect the goal of the group, which was to create an African American aesthetic that celebrated black power and a sense of community. During the interview with the Never the Same Organization in Chicago, Jarrell described her work with AfriCOBRA, which involved making textile designs done on leather or suede that she would then tie-dye, screen print, hand paint, and applique  The most famous pieces she did at this time are her Revolutionary Suit (1968), Ebony Family (1968), and Urban Wall Suit (1969).

The Revolutionary Suit (1968) is a two-piece suit that has Jarrell’s signature style from the late 60s. The suit has a tweed, collarless jacket and a-framed skirt, which matched the fashion trends of the time. This ensemble also incorporates a colorful, faux bandolier that stands out against the salt-and-pepper color of the suit. This piece, which inspired ideas about wearing clothing for protest and revolution, motivated Jet magazine to write a piece called "Black Revolt Sparks White Fashion Craze" which criticized white, mainstream fashion for cultural appropriation.  The magazine accused the fashion world of taking the bandolier, which was meant to be a symbol of the righteous protest against the unfair treatment of African Americans, and attempting to turn it into a trendy accessory.

Following one of the themes of AfriCOBRA, which emphasized the Black Family, Jarrell made her suit called Ebony Family (1968). It is meant to be a symbol of the power within strong black families. Ebony Family also emphasizes AfriCOBRA’s interest in the influence of African art and the use of bright and vivid "Cool-ade" colors. These "Cool-ade" colors were a play on the bright orange, cherry red, lemon yellow, lime green, and grape purple of the drink Kool-aid. Jarrell accomplishes this by crafting her suit to be like a poster which takes form as a dashiki, a traditional West African men's dress.  The suit depicts a colorful, Black family, using the forms reminiscent of the African mask to create their faces.

Jarrell’s Urban Wall Suit (1969) is a piece inspired by graffiti and concert posters that filled the streets and African American neighborhoods in Chicago.  Jarrell incorporated AfriCOBRA's desire to emphasize images with language by making the suit a symbol of the message boards of the community. All over the suit, there are images of posters that proclaim things like "Vote Democrat" as well as white graffiti messages that say things like "Black Princess" and "Miss Attitude." Furthermore, with Urban Wall Suit, Jarrell reused her fabric to follow one of the tenets of AfriCOBRA, which was to reinvent yourself in order to create something fresh. She used small pieces and scraps from her store to make the patchwork resembling bricks, adding velvet ribbon as the mortar. These fabric scraps are of all different colors and patterns, including stripes, polka dots, and plaid. She then incorporated the graffiti and poster elements that resembled the message boards.

The AfriCOBRA group identified themselves as a ‘family’. They came together in a cooperative, merging their unique styles into a collective aesthetic. In doing so the group was able to represent unity and strength in their art and their movement, while still letting their individual aspects and styles remain in each of their artworks. Through this unified, ‘family’ front the AfriCOBRA group was able to reject racialized stereotypes like that of the supposed dysfunctional black family. Their conjoined efforts brought a voice to the community; a voice representing their message and movement through their art. While Jae Jarrell and her husband continually worked with their art family for a movement they wholeheartedly believed in, they did eventually step away from the coalition. Jarrell has since emphasized the lasting and present influence AfriCOBRA has in her art – they didn’t leave coalition fully behind, the direction of their futures simply differed.

Though Jarrell is no longer with the AfriCOBRA collective, she still holds all those who were ever a part of the collective as family and says that she is still influenced by them when making art to this day.

In an interview with Rebecca Zorach Jae Jarrell explains that AfriCOBRA,"It’s like a family, you know, you could never divorce yourself from the family. You can only grow, and you could always understand those who have not moved in the same kind of direction you have, but there’s a language you have, and an eye contact and a trust and a respect. It goes a long way."

Later work 
In more recent years, Jarrell has not lost her passion for design, but she has shifted her focus to sculpting and constructing furniture  Some of her recent works, which were displayed in the "How to Remain Human" exhibition at the Museum of Contemporary Art Cleveland, include "Maasai Collar Vest" (2015), "Shields and Candelabra Vest" (2015), and "Jazz Scramble Jacket" (2015). The "Maasai Collar Vest" (2015) is reminiscent of the ornate garments and jewelry of the Maasai people in Africa. This piece draws on the idea of embracing her African heritage, which is something seen throughout all of her work. Jarrell continues emphasizing African art and culture in "Shields and Candelabra Vest" (2015) by making the piece from cactus plants turned over to make frames for vibrant African shields. For her "Jazz Scrabble Jacket" (2015), Jarrell brings together notions of jazz and blues music with images from the board game, Scrabble. Imitating the crossword aspect of Scrabble, Jarrell intersects the names of important musicians to examine the influence of music in building scenes, styles, power, and history for African American communities.

Exhibitions 
Jarrell's work has appeared in several major exhibitions, including the Brooklyn Museum of Art’s 2014 exhibition "Witness: Art and Civil Rights in the Sixties" and the Museum of Contemporary Art Cleveland's2015 exhibition "How to Remain Human". Jarrell's work was also featured in the 2015 exhibit "The Freedom Principle: Experiments in Art and Music", "1965 to Now" at the Museum of Contemporary Art Chicago (MoCAC). In 2019, her work, which primarily focused on revolution-themed clothing, was also featured along with other artists at The Broad in Los Angeles in a special exhibition called “Soul of a Nation”.

Her garments belong to private collections as well as to a permanent collection in the Brooklyn Museum of Art.

References

External links 

 Jae Jarrell at Brooklyn Museum

1935 births
African-American women artists
American textile artists
Women textile artists
Artists from Cleveland
Living people
21st-century African-American people
21st-century African-American women
20th-century African-American people
20th-century African-American women